Events from the year 1904 in art.

Events
 April
 Octavian Smigelschi is selected to paint the interior decoration of Holy Trinity Cathedral, Sibiu.
 George Frederic Watts (dies 1 July) opens the Watts Gallery in the English village of Compton, Guildford, for the display of his work.
 November – The Potters (artists group) is formed by female artists in St. Louis, Missouri.
 Start of Picasso's Rose Period.
 Georges Braque leaves the Academie Humbert.
 Mary Cassatt is awarded the Légion d'honneur by the French government for her services to the arts.
 British Impressionist painter Wilfrid de Glehn marries American portrait painter Jane Erin Emmet.
 Kaiser-Friedrich-Museum, Berlin, designed by Ernst von Ihne and noted for its Skulpturensammlung, is completed.

Works

Paintings
 Lawrence Alma-Tadema – The Finding of Moses
 Paul Cézanne 
 Mont Sainte-Victoire (Philadelphia Museum of Art)
 La Montagne Sainte-Victoire vue du bosquet du Château Noir
 Lady in Blue
 Mikalojus Konstantinas Čiurlionis – A Day
 Walter Dexter  – The Carpenter's Workshop
 Herbert James Draper – The Golden Fleece
 Florence Fuller – Summer Breezes
 J. W. Godward
 Dolce far Niente (second version)
 In The Days Of Sappho
 A Melody
 Thomas Cooper Gotch – Innocence
 Vilhelm Hammershøi – Interior with Young Woman Seen from the Back
 Winslow Homer – Kissing the Moon
 Gwen John – Dorelia in a Black Dress
 Edmund Leighton – Vox Populi ("'A little prince likely in time to bless a royal throne")
 Niels Moeller Lund – The Heart of the Empire
 Frederick McCubbin – The Pioneer (triptych)
 Herbert MacNair – The Gift of Doves
 Henri Matisse – Luxe, Calme et Volupté
 William Nicholson – portrait of J. M. Barrie
 Pablo Picasso
 The Actor
 Portrait of Suzanne Bloch
 Ilya Repin – Portrait of Leonid Nikolaievich Andreyev
 Franz Roubaud – The Siege of Sevastopol Panorama
 John Singer Sargent – Mrs Wertheimer
 Pavel Shtronda – Theotokos of Port Arthur
 Enrique Simonet – The Judgement of Paris
 Max Slevogt – Portrait of the Dancer Anna Pavlova
 Allen Butler Talcott – Lyme Meadow (approx. date)
 Viktor Vasnetsov – The Last Judgement (for St. George's Cathedral, Gus-Khrustalny, Russia)
 Maurice de Vlaminck – Sous bois

Photographs
 Edward Steichen
 The Flatiron Building
 The Pond—Moonlight

Sculptures

 Daniel Chester French
Colonel James Anderson Monument (Pittsburgh, Pennsylvania)
Statue of William Francis Bartlett (Massachusetts State House, Boston)
 Princess Louise, Duchess of Argyll – Memorial to Colonial soldiers who fell during the Boer War, in St Paul's Cathedral, London
 Hermon Atkins MacNeil – Coming of the White Man (Portland, Oregon)
 Rudolf and Wolfgang Siemering – Beethoven-Haydn-Mozart Memorial (Berlin)
 Antonio Sciortino – Les Gavroches

Stained-glass windows
 Tiffany Studio – Angel of the Resurrection

Architecture

 Larkin Administration Building, designed by Frank Lloyd Wright (demolished 1950)

Exhibitions
 "French Primitives", an exhibition of pre-Renaissance French art in Paris.

Births

January to June
 8 January – Peter Arno, American cartoonist (d. 1968).
 13 January – Oliver Messel, English stage designer (d. 1978).
 14 January – Cecil Beaton, English photographer and stage and costume designer (d. 1980).
 22 January – Kimon Evan Marengo, Egyptian-born British cartoonist (d. 1988).
 6 February – Dorothy Canning Miller American curator (d. 2003).
 22 February – Peter Hurd, American artist (d. 1984).
 27 February - Yi Eungro, South korea Abstract artist (d.1989)
 2 March – Theodor Seuss Geisel, American illustrator (d. 1991).
 17 March – Chaim Gross, Austrian American sculptor (d. 1991).
 31 March – Đorđe Andrejević Kun, Serbian painter (d. 1964).
4 April - Ulayu Pingwartok, Canadian Inuk artist
 15 April
 Mary Adshead, English painter (d. 1995).
 Arshile Gorky, Armenian-born abstract expressionist painter (d. 1948).
 21 April
 Jean Hélion, French painter (d. 1987).
 Gabriel Loire, French stained glass artist (d. 1996).
 24 April – Willem de Kooning, Dutch abstract expressionist painter (d. 1997).
 2 May – Bill Brandt, German-born British photographer and photojournalist (d. 1983).
 11 May – Salvador Dalí, Spanish surrealist artist (d. 1989).
 8 June – Alice Rahon, French-born Mexican surrealist poet and painter (d. 1987).
 14 June – Margaret Bourke-White, American photographer and photojournalist (d. 1971).

July to December
 2 August – Reg Parlett, English comics artist (d. 1991).
 11 September – Daniel Brustlein, Alsatian-born illustrator (d. 1996).
 23 October – Svetoslav Roerich, Russian painter (d. 1993).
 3 November – Emerik Feješ, Hungarian and Serbian painter (d. 1969).
 13 November – Stephen Bone, English painter (d. 1958).
 17 November – Isamu Noguchi, Japanese American artist and landscape architect (d. 1988).
 18 November – Jean Paul Lemieux, Canadian-American painter (d. 1990)
 22 November – Miguel Covarrubias, Mexican caricaturist and painter (d. 1957).
 30 November – Clyfford Still, American Abstract Expressionist painter (d. 1980).
 11 December – Felix Nussbaum, German Jewish surrealist painter (k. 1944).
 17 December – Paul Cadmus, American painter (d. 1999).
 21 December – Jean René Bazaine, French painter, stained glass artist and writer (d. 2001).

Full date unknown
 Joseph Delaney, African American painter (d. 1991).
 Juan Bautista Garcia, Puerto Rican painter (d. 1974).

Deaths
 January 8 – Alfred Felton, art collector (b. 1831)
 January 9 – Konrad Grob, painter (b. 1828)
 January 10 – Jean-Léon Gérôme, painter and sculptor (b. 1824)
 February 4 – Marie Firmin Bocourt, nature artist and engraver (b. 1819)
 May 6 – Franz von Lenbach, painter (b. 1836)
 May 8 – Eadweard Muybridge, photographer (b. 1830)
 June 20 – Frederic Sandys, painter (b. 1829)
 July 1 – George Frederic Watts, painter and sculptor (b. 1817)
 August 25 – Henri Fantin-Latour, painter and lithographer (b. 1836)
 September 3 – James Archer, portrait painter (b. 1823)
 September 4 – Martin Johnson Heade, painter (b. 1819)
 September 23
 Émile Gallé, artist in glass (b. 1846)
 George Anderson Lawson, sculptor (b. 1832)
 October 4 – Frédéric Bartholdi, sculptor (b. 1834)
 October 13 – Károly Lotz, painter (b. 1833)
 December 7 – Adolf Waldinger, painter from Osijek, Croatia (b. 1843)
 December 30 – John Horbury Hunt, architect (b. 1838)
 date unknown – Edwin Hayes, marine watercolourist (b. 1819)

References

 
Years of the 20th century in art
1900s in art